Type 5 may refer to:
 Type 5 cannon, a World War II cannon for aircraft
 Type 5 15 cm AA Gun
 Type 5 45 mm AT Recoilless Gun
 Type 5 Chi-Ri, a tank
 Type 5 Ke-Ho, a tank
 Type 5 Rifle
 Type 5 To-Ku, a tank
 CGMP specific phosphodiesterase type 5
 Hyper IgM Syndrome Type 5
 PDE5 inhibitor
Peugeot Type 5
 Dietrich-Bugatti, type 5 automobile
 Kawasaki Ki-100, a Japanese land based fighter aircraft of World War II
British Railways Type 5 Diesel locomotives